The Mackenzie Mountains are a Canadian mountain range forming part of the Yukon-Northwest Territories boundary between the Liard and Peel rivers. The range is named in honour of Canada's second prime minister, Alexander Mackenzie. Nahanni National Park Reserve and Nááts'ihch'oh National Park Reserve are in the Mackenzie Mountains.

The mining town of Tungsten, site of the Cantung Mine, is in the Mackenzie Mountains. Only two roads lead into the Mackenzie Mountains, both in Yukon: the Nahanni Range Road leading to the townsite of Tungsten and the Canol Road leading to the Macmillan Pass.

The second-highest mountain is Mount Nirvana.

The Silurian fish family Archipelepididae has been described from specimens found in the Mackenzie Mountains.

References

Canadian GeoNames Database entry

Further reading

 Aitken, J. D. (1991). The Ice Brook Formation and post-Rapitan, Late Proterozoic glaciation, Mackenzie Mountains, Northwest Territories. [Ottawa]: Energy, Mines and Resources Canada. 
 EXCELeration Corp. (2000). Benefits of outfitted hunting in the NWT Mackenzie mountains. Calgary: EXCELeration Corp.
 Hanke, G. F., Wilson, M. V., & Lindoe, L. A. (2001). New species of Silurian acanthodians from the Mackenzie Mountains, Canada. Canadian Journal of Earth Sciences. 38 (11), 1517.
 James, N., Narbonne, G., & Kyser, T. (2001). Late Neoproterozoic cap carbonates: Mackenzie Mountains, northwestern Canada: precipitation and global glacial meltdown. Canadian Journal of Earth Sciences. 38, 1229–1262.
 Keele, J. (1910). A reconnaissance across the Mackenzie mountains on the Pelly, Ross, and Gravel rivers, Yukon, and North West territories. Ottawa: Government printing bureau.
 Latour, Paul B. A Survey of Dall's Sheep in Zone E/1-1, Northern Mackenzie Mountains. Norman Wells, NWT: Dept. of Renewable Resources, Govt. of the Northwest Territories, 1992.
 Miller, S. J., Barichello, N., & Tait, D. E. N. (1982). The grizzly bears of the Mackenzie Mountains, Northwest Territories. Yellowknife, N.W.T.: N.W.T. Wildlife Service.
 Morrow, D. W., & Cook, D. G. (1987). The Prairie Creek Embayment and Lower Paleozoic strata of the southern Mackenzie Mountains. Ottawa, Canada: Energy, Mines and Resources Canada. 
 Porsild, A. E. (1940). The Alpine flora of the east slope of Mackenzie mountains, Northwest territories. Ottawa: E. Cloutier, Printer to the King.

External links

 Climate change in the Mackenzie Mountains (1995), Liang, L, Kershaw, G.P. Climate Research
 Mountain goat survey, Flat River area, Western Mackenzie Mountains (2004). Larter, N.C. Dept of Resources, Wildlife, and Economic Development, Gov't of the NWT. Manuscript Report No. 157.

Mountain ranges of Yukon
Mountain ranges of the Northwest Territories
Nahanni National Park Reserve